John William Juniper (6 February 1862 — 20 June 1885) was an English cricketer who played for Sussex from 1880 to 1885.

Juniper was born at Southwick, West Sussex and was a labourer. He  made his debut for Sussex at the age of 18 in June 1880 against Hampshire. He played for Sussex regularly for six seasons. In 1885 he caught a chill in the match against Cambridge University in 1885, which developed into typhoid fever, which resulted in his death, at Southwick, at the age of 23.

Juniper was a left-arm fast bowler and took 184 first-class wickets at an average of 19.69 and a best performance of 7 for 24. He played 97 innings in 57 first-class matches at an average of 6.71 and a top score of 31.

References 

1862 births
1885 deaths
People from Southwick, West Sussex
English cricketers
Sussex cricketers
Deaths from typhoid fever